Men's Open class competition in judo at the 1972 Summer Olympics in Munich, West Germany was held at Judo and Wrestling Hall.  Wim Ruska was the strong favorite to win a second gold medal, having already won gold in the +93 kg weight class.  In a surprise Vitali Kuznetsov threw Ruska defeating him using Te Guruma.  Kuznetsov ended up winning the pool allowing Ruska to continue in the repechage.  Ruska ended up facing Kuznetsov in the finals where he used a different game plan, using yoko-shiho-gatame to win the match.  Ruska retired after the Munich Games being the only judoka to win two gold medals in the same Olympics.

Results

Finals

Repechages

Pool A

Pool B

References

External links
 Official reports of the 1972 Summer Olympics

Judo at the 1972 Summer Olympics
Judo at the Summer Olympics Men's Openweight